Ararat F.C. may refer to:

FC Ararat Yerevan, based in Yerevan, Armenia
F.C. Ararat Tehran, based in Tehran, Iran
FC Ararat Moscow, amateur football club based in Moscow, Russia